Sydney Buses could refer to
a previously used name for a subsidiary of the State Transit Authority providing bus services in parts of Sydney
general information on bus services in Sydney
general information on bus operators in Sydney